The Women's singles luge competition at the 1998 Winter Olympics in Nagano was held on 10 and 11 February, at Spiral.

Results

References

Luge at the 1998 Winter Olympics
1998 in women's sport
Women's events at the 1998 Winter Olympics